Farm to Market Road 471 (FM 471) is an FM highway in the San Antonio area of Texas. The highway is known as Culebra Road within Bexar County.

Route description
FM 471 begins at an intersection with I-35 in Natalia. The highway shortly begins an overlap with SH 132 and the two highways travel through the town together. FM 471 leaves the highway and travels to the town of LaCoste. The highway enters Castroville and has a short overlap with US 90. FM 471 serves the small community of Rio Medina before intersecting FM 1283 near Lake Medina. The highway turns after here and runs in a southeast (northbound)-northwest (southbound) direction, despite still being signed north-south. FM 471 enters the city of San Antonio near the Government Canyon State Natural Area. Near SeaWorld, FM 471 ends at an intersection Loop 1604 (Anderson Loop).

History

Previous route
FM 471 was first designated on July 9, 1945 from Dilley to Divot. The highway was then extended further north  toward Batesville on July 22, 1949. The route was cancelled the next month on August 25. The highway was combined with FM 117.

Current route
FM 471 opened May 23, 1951, running from US 81 (now SH 132) in Natalia to US 90 in Castroville. On January 29, 1953, FM 1105 from US 90 north and east  to a road intersection was cancelled and combined with FM 471. The highway was extended further east to SH 16 later that year on October 28. The highway was extended further south to I-35 on May 6, 1964. On June 27, 1995, the entire route from Loop 1604 to SH 16 was designated Urban Road 471 (UR 471).

On December 18, 2014, the section of FM 471 between Loop 1604 and the Leon Valley city limits was turned back to the city of San Antonio and deleted from the state highway system; this was part of TxDOT's San Antonio turnback program, which gave 21.8 miles of roads to the city. By 2018, the project acceptance letter was issued. As a result of the order and project acceptance letter, the section of FM 471 within Leon Valley became State Highway Spur 471. This eliminated UR 471.

Junction list

Spur 471

Spur 471 is a state highway spur located in Leon Valley. The highway was designated on December 18, 2014 when FM 471 was decommissioned inside Loop 1604. The highway begins at the San Antonio–Leon Valley city limits and runs east for approximately a half mile to State Highway 16 (Bandera Road). Spur 471 is known locally as Grissom Road. An Earlier Spur 471 was designated on October 1, 1968, from I-20 in Colorado City to Loop 377. This was cancelled on June 21, 1990 and changed to Business State Highway 208-B. Loop 377 became Business Interstate 20-J that same day.

Junction list

See also

References

0471
Transportation in Medina County, Texas
Transportation in Bexar County, Texas
Transportation in San Antonio